Van den Bergh, Van Den Bergh is a Dutch surname, a variant of Van den Berg. Notable people with the surname include:

Arnold van den Bergh (notary) (1886‒1950), Amsterdam civil law notary
Dave van den Bergh (born 1976), Dutch footballer
Dimitri Van den Bergh (born 1994), Belgian darts player
Frans Van den Bergh (1914–1990), Belgian businessman
Freddie van den Bergh (born 1992), English cricketer
Frederik van den Bergh (1559–1618), Dutch soldier
George van den Bergh (1890–1966), Dutch lawyer and astronomer
Gert Van den Bergh (1920–1968), South African actor
Gertrude van den Bergh (c. 1793 – 1840), Dutch classical pianist and composer
Gustaaf Adolf van den Bergh van Eysinga (1874–1957), Dutch theologian
Hendrik van den Bergh (count) (1573–1638), Dutch noble and soldier
Hendrik van den Bergh (police official) (1914–1997), South African police official
Henri W.PH.E. van den Bergh van Eysinga (1868–1920), Dutch writer and activist
Herman van den Bergh (1558–1611), Dutch stadtholder
Hijmans van den Bergh (1869–1943), Dutch physician
Van den Bergh reaction, chemical reaction
Johannes van den Bergh (born 1986), German footballer
Lode Van Den Bergh (born 1920), Belgian writer
Maarten van den Bergh (born 1942), Dutch businessman
Matthias Jansz van den Bergh (1618–1687), Dutch Golden Age painter
Michel Van den Bergh (born 1960), Belgian mathematician and academic
Regardt van den Bergh, South African actor and film director
Ricky van den Bergh (born 1980), Dutch footballer
Samuel van den Bergh (1864–1941), Dutch businessman
Sidney van den Bergh (born 1929), Canadian astronomer
Sidney J. van den Bergh (1898–1977), Dutch businessman, military officer and politician
Simon van den Bergh (1819–1907), Dutch businessman
Solko van den Bergh (1854–1916), Dutch sport shooter
Willem IV van den Bergh (1537–1586), Dutch stadtholder

See also
Van den Berg
Land van den Bergh, Dutch lordship
Museum Mayer van den Bergh, museum in Antwerp, Belgium
Van den Bergh catalogue, the VdB catalogue of reflection nebulae
Van den Bergh (crater), lunar crater
4230 van den Bergh outer main-belt asteroid

Dutch-language surnames
Afrikaans-language surnames
Surnames of Dutch origin